Cleawox Lake (klē' ə woks), is a body of water dammed by sand dunes along the Pacific Ocean coast of the U.S. state of Oregon. Sharing the lakeshore are private properties as well as Oregon Dunes National Recreation Area and Jessie M. Honeyman Memorial State Park, which also partly fronts on Woahink Lake. Cleawox is derived from the Siuslaw name for the lake.

Geology
Cleawox Lake is a submerged remnant of the headwaters of a small coastal stream that existed before the most recent ice age. The lake formed after melting glaciers caused a rise in sea level that drowned the lower reaches of the stream. Sediments from the sluggish stream formed sand dunes, behind which the lake was dammed. The dunes, estimated to be advancing northward at  a year, are encroaching on the lake.

Watershed

Covering only , Cleawox Lake's drainage basin is separate from the nearby Woahink–Siltcoos watershed to the east and south. Water enters Cleawox from small surface streams and by seepage, and no surface outflow has been identified. Soils are sandy and well-drained and support mainly pines and shrubs. Although the lake is saltier than most other coastal lakes in Oregon, it is also more transparent.

About  of the lakeshore borders Oregon Dunes National Recreation Area, and about  borders Honeyman State Park. The rest borders private property, including vacation homes and girl scout Camp Cleawox.

Recreation
Park visitors use the lake for swimming, canoeing, and fishing for warm-water species and rainbow and coastal cutthroat trout. In the state park, picnic tables have been set up in sight of the water. No overnight camping is allowed next to the lake, but nearby areas of the state park have many campsites.

See also
List of lakes in Oregon

References

External links

Lakes of Oregon
Lakes of Lane County, Oregon